Sevgi Uzun (born 25 November 1997) is a Turkish basketball player for Ormanspor and the Turkish national team.

References

External links
 Sevgi Uzun at FIBA
 Sevgi Uzun at tbf.org
 Sevgi Uzun at eurobasket.com

1997 births
Living people
Turkish women's basketball players
Beşiktaş women's basketball players
Fenerbahçe women's basketball players